Celina Degen (born 16 May 2001 in Graz) is an Austrian footballer. She plays for the Austria women's national football team.

She competed at the 2018 UEFA Women's Under-17 Championship, 2019 UEFA Women's Under-19 Championship, 2019 Cyprus Women's Cup, 2021 Malta International Women's Football Tournament, and UEFA Women's Euro 2022.

On the club level, she played for 1899 Hoffenheim and plays for FC Köln.

References 

2001 births
Living people
Austrian women's footballers
Austrian expatriate women's footballers
Expatriate women's footballers in Germany
Austrian expatriate sportspeople in Germany
Women's association footballers not categorized by position